Matang (Jawi: ماتڠ) is a mukim in Larut, Matang and Selama District, Perak, Malaysia. It has many small towns and villages and is located near Taiping, Simpang, Kamunting and Kuala Sepetang. Historical fort Kota Ngah Ibrahim is situated there. 

Larut, Matang and Selama District
Populated places in Perak
Towns in Perak